Mangai Ii Airport  is a closed airport that formerly served the town of Mangai in Democratic Republic of the Congo.

See also

Transport in the Democratic Republic of the Congo
List of airports in the Democratic Republic of the Congo

References

Defunct airports
Airports in Kwilu Province